The 1990 Oklahoma Sooners football team represented the University of Oklahoma during the 1990 NCAA Division I-A football season. They played their home games at Oklahoma Memorial Stadium and competed as members of the Big Eight Conference. They were coached by second-year head coach Gary Gibbs. They were ineligible to participate in a bowl game since they were on probation.

Schedule

Roster

Game summaries

at UCLA

at Oklahoma State

Texas

Iowa State

at Colorado

Source: Box score

at Missouri

Kansas State

Nebraska

Rankings

Oklahoma was on probation in 1990 and ineligible to receive votes in the Coaches Poll.

Awards
All-Big Eight: DB Jason Belser, LB Joe Bowden, TE Adrian Cooper, DT Scott Evans, OG Mike Sawatzky

Postseason

NFL draft

The following players were drafted into the National Football League following the season.

References

Oklahoma
Oklahoma Sooners football seasons
Oklahoma Sooners football